Gunnar Fredriksen (28 February 1907 – 1 May 1994) was a Norwegian athlete. He competed in the men's decathlon at the 1928 Summer Olympics.

References

External links
 

1907 births
1994 deaths
Athletes (track and field) at the 1928 Summer Olympics
Norwegian decathletes
Olympic athletes of Norway
People from Oppland
Sportspeople from Innlandet